Donie may refer to:

People 

 Donie Buckley, Gaelic footballer
 Donie Bush, American baseball player
 Donie Cassidy, Irish politician
 Donie Murphy, Gaelic footballer
 Donie O'Donovan, Gaelic football manager
 Donie Ryan, Irish hurler
 Donie Shine, Gaelic football manager
 Scott Donie, American diver

Places 

 Donie Church, a Romanian Orthodox church
 Donie, Texas, an unincorporated area

See also 
 Donal Courtney, Irish actor
 Donald Walsh, Irish marathon runner
 Donie O'Sullivan (disambiguation)
 Nancy Jewel McDonie, Korean-American actress and singer